Polkacide was a band based in the San Francisco Bay Area that played "punk polka".

Band history 
Polkacide was founded in 1985 by Ward Abronski, originally organized to play a one-time show for the 50th anniversary of the Deaf Club in San Francisco. None of the 12 original members were polka musicians at the time, but they had varied backgrounds in classical, rock, punk and jazz music. Clarinetist Neil Kaitner came up with the name for the band and also designed the band logo, which features a skull and crossed sausages. One week before the performance was to take place, it was cancelled due to noise abatement orders from local authorities. Rather than not be able to play, the band decided to play at least one performance in a punk show at the Mabuhay Gardens in San Francisco.

The band subsequently appeared on the Doctor Demento television show and made several recordings. After 32 years together, they played a farewell concert on 8 October 2017, entitled "The Last Polka".

References

External links 
 

Punk rock groups from California
Musical groups from San Francisco